Volvariella leucocalix is a species of fungus in the family Pluteaceae. Its name is attributed to the white volva pertaining to the species. More specifically, the name comes from the Greek words, ‘leuco’, meaning a whitish color, and ‘calix’, meaning cup. First described by Sa MCA and Felipe Wartchow in 2016 as a species of Volvariella.

Description 
The sporocarp is small and has a fuliginous brown umbonate cap with a diameter of 26 mm. The stem is white and becomes narrower the farther up it is and is hollow at its apex. Based on a sample of 30 basidiospores, it was found that their length ranged from 5–5.6 × 2.6–3.6 µm, with an average length 5.2 µm for a single basidiome, the spores are also are ellipsoid to elongate and pinkish/salmon in color.

References

External links 
 

Fungi of South America
Pluteaceae